Gümüşören ( or) is a village in the Pervari District in the Siirt Province of Turkey. The population was 542 in 2021.

The hamlet of Ulupınar is attached to the village.

References

Kurdish settlements in Siirt Province
Villages in Pervari District